The women's 200 metre individual medley competition of the swimming events at the 1991 Pan American Games took place on 17 August. The last Pan American Games champion was Susan Habermas of US.

This race consisted of four lengths of the pool, one each in backstroke, breaststroke, butterfly and freestyle swimming.

Results
All times are in minutes and seconds.

Heats

Final 
The final was held on August 17.

References

Swimming at the 1991 Pan American Games
Pan